Mars Ravelo's Lastikman: Unang Banat, or simply Lastikman: Unang Banat, is a 2004 Philippine superhero film based on the comic book character Lastikman, directed by Mac Alejandre and written by RJ Nuevas. It stars Mark Bautista, Sarah Geronimo, Cherie Gil, John Estrada, Danilo Barrios, Elizabeth Oropesa, Joel Torre, Mark Gil, Bearwin Meily, and Tuesday Vargas. The film was released through Viva Films on December 25, 2004, as part of the 30th Metro Manila Film Festival. The subheading is a pun that can mean First Strike or First Stretch

Plot
Adrian (Mark Bautista), is an ordinary boy who lacks skills and talents. He likes his friend Lara (Sarah Geronimo), but is often bullied by his classmates and kids in the neighborhood. Despite being a weakling, Adrian possesses a pure and brave heart when he tries to fight illegal loggers who cut trees on their barrio. Unfortunately, he is beaten by the loggers and left almost half dead. But because of his pure personality, the enchanted rubber tree that he saves heals him and grants him powers that transform him into a super hero named Lastikman who can stretch his body at incredible distance and transform into different objects. After a series of exploits, he, his family and Lara move to Manila. On the other hand, the tree also gives powers to Editha (Cherie Gil), a single mother who lost her children in a witch-hunt after being falsely accused of being an aswang, granting her the same powers as Lastikman, as well as shapeshifting powers and carnivorous tentacles that grow on her back. Assuming the identity Lastika, she takes revenge on her tormentors and moves to Manila, where she unsuccessfully tries to entice Lastikman to join her in her bid for world domination after saving him from a Werewolf. After more exploits, Lastikman confronts Lastika for a final time when she shapeshifts into him while committing a series of crimes. Lastika initially has the upper hand, but is killed when Lastikman pulls down a live wire on the puddle of spilled gasoline that Lastika is standing over, incinerating her. Lara realizes that Lastikman and Adrian are the same person and the movie ends with them becoming a couple.

Casts

Main cast
Mark Bautista as Adrian Rosales / Lastikman
Sarah Geronimo as Lara Manuel

Supporting cast
Cherie Gil as Editha / Lastika
John Estrada as Alfonso
Danilo Barrios as Reden
Joel Torre as Pablo
Bearwin Meily as Garoy
John Manalo as Butil
Elizabeth Oropesa as Susan
Tuesday Vargas as Maritess
Mark Gil as Andrew
Vangie Labalan as Delia
Athena Tibi as Christy
Kristel Fulgar as Letlet
Saver as Asong Itim ("Black Dog")
Rosauro "Boy" Roque as Taong Aso
Bobby Andrews as Adan
Marky Lopez as Joko
Vanna Garcia as Anna
Ella V. as Gelay
Miles Ocampo as Young Lara
Crystal Moreno as Lara's Step Sister
JC Parker as a sexy werewolf victim (cameo)
Isabella De Leon as a child werewolf victim (cameo)

Accolades

References

External links

Lastikman
2004 films
2004 drama films
2004 fantasy films
2000s superhero films
Films based on Philippine comics
Live-action films based on comics
Philippine films based on comics
Philippine superhero films
Viva Films films
Films directed by Mac Alejandre